Harry P. Bauler (November 30, 1910 – December 6, 1962) was an American politician.

Background
Born in Chicago, Illinois, Bauler was the general superintendent of the Department of Sanitation with the City of Chicago and was involved with the Democratic Party. His father, Mathias Bauler (1890–1977), was a member of the Chicago City Council. In November 1962, Bauler was elected to the Illinois House of Representatives but died of a heart attack, in his office, in Chicago before he took the oath of office as a representative.

Notes

External links

1910 births
1962 deaths
Politicians from Chicago
Elected officials who died without taking their seats
Democratic Party members of the Illinois House of Representatives
20th-century American politicians